Brachynarthron unicoloripennis is a species of beetle in the family Cerambycidae. It was described by Stephan von Breuning in 1968. It is known from the Ivory Coast.

References

Endemic fauna of Ivory Coast
Protonarthrini
Beetles described in 1968